Torin Yater-Wallace (born December 2, 1995, in Aspen, Colorado) is a freestyle skier from the United States. He won a silver medal at Winter X Games XV in the superpipe, making him the youngest medalist in Winter X-Games history. Torin is one of the best up-and-coming free skiers in the world.

During the summer, Yater-Wallace can be found at Mt. Hood, Oregon, where he hosts a Takeover Session at Windells Camp.

Early and personal life
At just 15 years of age, Yater-Wallace was the third-youngest male competitor in Winter X Games history. In early 2016 he bought a house in Basalt, Colorado.

Career

2016  Competition Highlights

1st Winter X-Games Europe Oslo Norway

2014  Competition Highlights

1st Olympics Sochi, Russia

2013 Competition Highlights 
2nd Winter X-Games Aspen, CO
2nd US Grand Prix Park City, UT
1st Olympic Test Event Sochi, Russia
2nd FIS World Championships Voss, Norway
1st Winter X-Games Europe Tignes France

2012 Competition Highlights 
1st NZ Winter Games Snowpark, NZ
2nd NZ Freeski Open Candrona, NZ
3rd Winter Dew Tour Ogden, UT
1st Winter Dew Tour, Killington, VT
2nd Winter Dew Tour Overall
3rd Winter X-Games Aspen, CO
1st Winter X-Games Europe Tignes, FR

During the 2012 U.S. Grand Prix slopestyle competition, Yater-Wallace landed the first switch 1800 jump completed in competition

2011 Competition Highlights 
2nd Winter X-Games Aspen
3rd Winter X-Games Europe, Tignes, France
2nd Grand Prix Copper, CO

Film segments

2021 'Good Luck' - Deviate Productions

2020 'Deviate' - Deviate Productions

2017 'Back to Life' - Red Bull Mediahouse

2013 'Partly Cloudy' – Level 1 Productions

2012 ‘Sunny’ – Level 1 Productions

2011 ‘Attack of La Nina’ – Matchstick Productions

References

External links
 
 
 
 
 
 Torin Yater-Wallace at armadaskis.com 
 
 
 

1995 births
Living people
American male freestyle skiers
Olympic freestyle skiers of the United States
Freestyle skiers at the 2014 Winter Olympics
Freestyle skiers at the 2018 Winter Olympics
X Games athletes
Superpipe skiers
Sportspeople from Aspen, Colorado
People from Basalt, Colorado